Lake Sirio ( is a lake in northern Italy. Located between the comunes of Ivrea and Chiaverano, it is the largest of a group of five glacial lakes known as Laghi di Ivrea. The historic Società Canottieri Sirio, founded in 1887, occupies its southern shore.

External links

Lake Sirio on Visit Canavese on Turismo Torino e Provincia—

Sirio
Metropolitan City of Turin